Queso de mano ("cheese of the hand") is a type of soft, white cheese (queso fresco) most commonly associated with Venezuelan cuisine. It is most often used as a filling for arepas and cachapa.  The taste and consistency of the cheese most closely resembles that of mozzarella but is built up in layers.

Preparation
Queso de mano is prepared using a combination of cow's milk and ewe's milk curd. The resulting product is called cuajada. Once this step is attained, the cuajada is mixed with hot water to ensure the elasticity of the cheese. The mixture is then cooled in special molds which give the resulting cheese a roughly spherical appearance.

Variants
A local version of the cheese, called guayanés cheese is popular in the state of Bolivar.

See also
 List of cheeses

References 

Venezuelan cheeses